WLCZ (98.7 FM) is a Christian radio station licensed to serve the community of Lincolnton, Georgia. The station is owned by Glory Communications, Inc., and airs a gospel/inspirational music format.

The station was assigned the WLCZ call letters by the Federal Communications Commission on February 13, 2012.

References

External links
 Official Website
 

Radio stations established in 2012
2012 establishments in Georgia (U.S. state)
Gospel radio stations in the United States
Lincoln County, Georgia
LCZ